is a Japanese science fiction novel series written by Issui Ogawa and illustrated by Range Murata.  Four novels were published under Kadokawa's Kadokawa Haruki imprint between January 2002 and November 2003.  An anime adaptation has been announced for fall 2018.

Volumes

References

External links

  

2002 Japanese novels
Japanese science fiction novels
Science fiction anime and manga
2002 science fiction novels